Carlos Bustamente was a U.S. soccer forward. Born in Peru, he later played in Mexico and Canada before moving to New York for the 1960–61 season with the Brooklyn Italians of the German American Soccer League. He was a guest player with New York Hakoah on a tour of Bermuda.  He earned one cap with the U.S. national team in a 2-0 loss to Colombia on February 5, 1961.

After playing for Universitorea Lima in Peru and Atlante F.C. in Mexico, Bustamente joined Montreal Canadian Alouettes FC for the 1959 season. In September, the team won their first Canadian title, defeating the Westminster Royals FC to lift the Carling’s Red Cap Trophy. At the start of the 1960 season, Bustamente was again with the Montreal team, who were now re-named Montreal Concordia FC. In August of that year, he was one of five players suspended by the Canadian Football Soccer Association for leaving his club without permission (he had joined New York Colombo for a tour of Italy).

In March 1961 Bustamente, along with teammate Antonio Bonezzi, was brought to Israel in order to assist Beitar Tel Aviv with its bid to avoid relegation during the 1960–61 season. The two played one match for Beitar before they were suspended for ineligibility, as it was forbidden to field foreign players. Bustamente and Bonezzi were allowed to appear for beitar the following season.

Bustamente left for Beitar Ramla at the beginning of the 1966–68 season. On 1 January 1967 Bustamente was critically injured in a work-related accident which killed his Bonezzi, and subsequently retired. He married an Israeli woman and settled in Bat Yam.

References

American soccer players
Brooklyn Italians players
Israeli footballers
United States men's international soccer players
German-American Soccer League players
Beitar Tel Aviv F.C. players
Living people
Association football forwards
Year of birth missing (living people)